Division No. 7, Subd. N is an unorganized subdivision in eastern Newfoundland, Newfoundland and Labrador, Canada. It is in Division No. 7 on Freshwater Bay.

According to the 2016 Statistics Canada Census:
Population: 49
% Change (2011-2016): -15.5
Dwellings: 166
Area (km2.): 1,407.16
Density (persons per km2.): 0

Newfoundland and Labrador subdivisions